"Physical" is a song recorded by British-Australian singer Olivia Newton-John for her 1981 eleventh studio album of the same name. It was released as the album's lead single on 28 September 1981. The song was produced by John Farrar and written by Steve Kipner and Terry Shaddick, who had originally intended to offer it to Rod Stewart. The song had also been offered to Tina Turner by her manager Roger Davies, but when Turner declined, Davies gave the song to Newton-John, another of his clients.

"Physical" was an immediate smash hit, shipping two million copies in the United States, where it was certified Platinum by the Recording Industry Association of America (RIAA), and spent 10 weeks at number one on the Billboard Hot 100. "Physical" ultimately became Newton-John's biggest hit and cemented her legacy as a pop superstar, a journey that began when she crossed over from her earlier country pop roots. The song's suggestive lyric, which even caused it to be banned in some markets, helped change Newton-John's longstanding clean-cut image, replacing it with a sexy, assertive persona that was strengthened with follow-up hits such as "Make a Move on Me", "Twist of Fate" and "Soul Kiss".

Background and recording
"Physical" (originally "Let's Get Physical") was written by Terry Shaddick and Newton-John's longtime friend Steve Kipner, and initially was intended for a "macho male rock figure like Rod Stewart", according to Kipner. When Newton-John's then manager Lee Kramer accidentally heard the demo, he immediately sent the song to her, but initially she did not want to release the song, because it was "too cheeky". It was the first of several Newton-John releases written by Kipner.

The song's guitar solo was performed by Steve Lukather, best known as a founding member of the American rock band Toto. "Physical" is written in the key of E minor with Newton-John's vocal range spanning from A3 to E5.

Reception
"Physical" was described by Mark Ellen of Smash Hits as "one of the most successful career-revivers in living memory". It is the most successful single of Newton-John's career and became her fifth (and last) number-one single on the US Billboard Hot 100. "Physical" stayed for 10 weeks on the top of Hot 100, from 21 November 1981 through 23 January 1982, out of a total of 26 weeks on the chart. It was the largest permanence at the time, becoming the most successful song on the Billboard in the 1980s. The song was very controversial due to the implied sexual content, being innovative and somewhat provocative for the time.

"Physical" has received positive reviews from music critics since release, with some of them calling it "good-naturedly sexy" and "an eighties gem".  Record World attributed its success to a "big pounding beat and the lusty idea of Olivia getting physical." The song won a Grammy Award for Video of the Year and won the Billboard Award for Top Pop Single.

Chart performance
"Physical" rose to number one on the US Billboard Hot 100 in November 1981 and stayed there for 10 weeks (the most of any single in the 1980s), remaining until the second half of January 1982. It reached number two on the Radio & Records CHR/Pop Airplay chart on 27 November 1981, staying there for two weeks and remaining on the chart for 14 weeks. In terms of chart placement, "Physical" was Newton-John's most successful single in the United States, and her final single to reach the top spot. Billboard ranked the song as the number-one single of 1982 (since the chart year for 1982 actually began in November 1981). In Canada, the song was number one for five weeks beginning 19 December 1981, was on the Top 50 charts for 26 weeks, and was her sixth number-one song.

"Physical" was both preceded and followed in the number-one chart position by recordings by American duo Hall & Oates: "Private Eyes" was dethroned by "Physical" in November 1981 and "Physical" was supplanted by "I Can't Go for That (No Can Do)" the following January. "Physical" held Foreigner's "Waiting for a Girl Like You" at number two on the Hot 100 for nine weeks and "I Can't Go for That (No Can Do)" then held Foreigner at number two for a tenth and final consecutive week. "Physical" remained in the top ten for a total of 15 weeks, thus making it the longest run of 1981, as well as tying it for the longest run of the decade among number-one singles. "Physical" also peaked at number 28 on the Hot Soul Singles chart.

"Physical" achieved great success around the world, reaching number seven in the United Kingdom, where it was certified Silver. However, the song was censored and even banned by some radio stations as a result of its sexually suggestive content, such as the line "There's nothing left to talk about, unless it's horizontally".

Also, the line "Let me hear your body talk" caused some radio stations to ban the song.

Music video

Synopsis

The accompanying music video for "Physical", directed by Brian Grant, features Newton-John in a tight leotard trying to make several overweight men lose weight. The men fail comically and Newton-John leaves the room to take a shower. When the men work out on their own, they suddenly transform into muscular, attractive men. A stylistic shot shows one muscular man glancing at his overweight self in a mirror. Newton-John is shocked when she returns and starts to flirt with them. Two of the men secretly go out, holding hands, implying they are gay. This surprises Newton-John, as does the sight of two more of the men leaving with their arms around each other. Finally, she finds that the last of the overweight men is heterosexual and they go off to play tennis together.

Reception
The Olivia Physical music video collection, which contained "Physical", won a Grammy Award for Video of the Year in 1983. The video was featured on VH1's Pop-Up Video and was the first video to air on Beavis and Butt-head.

Legacy and other versions
Billboard ranked "Physical" number six on its "All Time Top 100" list, number one on its "Top 50 Sexiest Songs of All Time" list, and number one on its "Top 100 Songs of the 1980s" list.

A revamped bossa nova version of the song was released on the 2002 Newton-John album (2) as a bonus track, and this version replaced the original in Newton-John's tours. Her duet with Jane Lynch was included in the episode "Bad Reputation" of the television series Glee. This version peaked at number 89 on the Billboard Hot 100 in May 2010.

Personnel
From the Physical album's liner notes:

 Olivia Newton-John – lead and backing vocals
 John Farrar – guitar and backing vocals
 Steve Lukather – guitar solo
 David Hungate – bass
 Bill Cuomo – Prophet 5
 Robert Blass – keyboards
 Carlos Vega – drums and percussion
 Lenny Castro – percussion
 Gary Herbig – horns

Charts

Weekly charts

Year-end charts

Decade-end charts

All-time charts

Certifications and sales

See also

List of number-one singles in Australia during the 1980s
List of RPM number-one singles of 1981
List of RPM number-one singles of 1982
List of number-one singles in 1981 (New Zealand)
List of number-one singles in 1982 (New Zealand)
List of number-one hits of 1981 (Switzerland)
List of Hot 100 number-one singles of 1981 (U.S.)
List of Hot 100 number-one singles of 1982 (U.S.)

References

External links

MTV Video stills

1981 singles
1981 songs
Billboard Hot 100 number-one singles
Cashbox number-one singles
EMI Records singles
MCA Records singles
Music video controversies
Number-one singles in Australia
Number-one singles in New Zealand
Number-one singles in Switzerland
Olivia Newton-John songs
Sophie Ellis-Bextor songs
RPM Top Singles number-one singles
Song recordings produced by John Farrar
Songs written by Steve Kipner
Ultratop 50 Singles (Flanders) number-one singles